Montana became a territory May 28, 1864 and the first delegation created nine counties: Beaverhead, Big Horn (renamed Custer in 1877), Chouteau, Deer Lodge, Gallatin, Jefferson, Edgerton (renamed Lewis and Clark in 1867), Madison, and Missoula. Montana became a state on November 8, 1889

Montana has a history of voters splitting their tickets and filling elected offices with individuals from both parties. Through the mid-20th century, the state had a tradition of "sending the liberals to Washington and the conservatives to Helena". Between 1988 and 2006, the pattern flipped, with voters more likely to elect conservatives to federal offices. There have also been long-term shifts in party control. From 1968 through 1988, the state was dominated by the Democratic Party, with Democratic governors for a 20-year period, and a Democratic majority of both the national congressional delegation and during many sessions of the state legislature. This pattern shifted, beginning with the 1988 election when Montana elected a Republican governor for the first time since 1964 and sent a Republican to the U.S. Senate for the first time since 1948. This shift continued with the reapportionment of the state's legislative districts that took effect in 1994, when the Republican Party took control of both chambers of the state legislature, consolidating a Republican party dominance that lasted until the 2004 reapportionment produced more swing districts and a brief period of Democratic legislative majorities in the mid-2000s.

Montana has voted for the Republican nominee in all but two presidential elections since 1952. The state last supported a Democrat for president in 1992, when Bill Clinton won a plurality victory. However, since 1889 the state has voted for Democratic governors 60 percent of the time, and Republican governors 40 percent of the time. In the 2008 presidential election, Montana was considered a swing state and was ultimately won by Republican John McCain by a narrow margin of two percent.

In a 2020 study, Montana was ranked as the 21st easiest state for citizens to vote in.

1890s
Included representatives from additional territorial counties: Meagher (1866), Dawson (1869), Silver Bow (1881), Yellowstone (1883), Fergus (1885), Park (1887), and Cascade (1887)

1892 elections
United States presidential election in Montana, 1892

1896 elections
First election to include Flathead, Valley, Teton, Ravalli, Granite, Carbon, and Sweet Grass counties.
United States presidential election in Montana, 1896

1900s

1900 elections
First election to include Broadwater County
United States presidential election in Montana, 1900

1904 elections
First election to include Powell and Rosebud counties.
United States presidential election in Montana, 1904

1908 elections
First election to include Sanders County
United States presidential election in Montana, 1908

1910s

1912 elections
First election to include Lincoln, Musselshell, Hill and Blaine counties.
United States presidential election in Montana, 1912

1916 elections
First election to include Big Horn, Stillwater, Sheridan, Fallon, Toole, Richland, Mineral, Wibaux, Phillips, and Prairie counties.
United States presidential election in Montana, 1916

1918 elections
United States Senate election in Montana, 1918

1920s

1920 elections
First election to include Liberty, Golden Valley, and Daniels counties.
United States presidential election in Montana, 1920

1922 elections
United States Senate election in Montana, 1922

1924 elections
First election to include Judith Basin and Lake counties.
United States presidential election in Montana, 1924
United States Senate election in Montana, 1924

1928 elections
First election to include Petroleum County.
United States presidential election in Montana, 1928
United States Senate election in Montana, 1928

1930s

United States Senate election in Montana, 1930

1932 elections
United States presidential election in Montana, 1932

1934 elections
United States Senate election in Montana, 1934
United States Senate special election in Montana, 1934

1936 elections
United States presidential election in Montana, 1936
United States Senate election in Montana, 1936

1940s

1940 elections
United States presidential election in Montana, 1940
United States Senate election in Montana, 1940

1942 elections
United States Senate election in Montana, 1942

1944 elections
United States presidential election in Montana, 1944

1946 elections
United States Senate election in Montana, 1946

1948 elections
United States presidential election in Montana, 1948
United States Senate election in Montana, 1948

1950s

1952 elections
United States presidential election in Montana, 1952
United States Senate election in Montana, 1952

1954 elections
United States Senate election in Montana, 1954

1956 elections
United States presidential election in Montana, 1956

1958 elections
United States Senate election in Montana, 1958

1960s

1960 elections
United States presidential election in Montana, 1960
United States Senate election in Montana, 1960

1964 elections
United States presidential election in Montana, 1964
United States Senate election in Montana, 1964

1966 elections
United States Senate election in Montana, 1966

1968 elections
United States presidential election in Montana, 1968

1970s

1970 elections
United States Senate election in Montana, 1970

1972 elections
United States presidential election in Montana, 1972
United States Senate election in Montana, 1972

1976 elections
United States presidential election in Montana, 1976
United States Senate election in Montana, 1976

1978 elections
United States Senate election in Montana, 1978

1980s

1980 elections
United States presidential election in Montana, 1980

1982 elections
United States Senate election in Montana, 1982

1984 elections
United States presidential election in Montana, 1984
United States Senate election in Montana, 1984

1988 elections
United States presidential election in Montana, 1988
United States Senate election in Montana, 1988

1990s

1990 elections
United States Senate election in Montana, 1990

1992 elections
United States presidential election in Montana, 1992

1994 elections
United States Senate election in Montana, 1994

1996 elections
United States presidential election in Montana, 1996
United States Senate election in Montana, 1996

2000s

2000 elections
United States presidential election in Montana, 2000
United States Senate election in Montana, 2000

2002 elections
United States Senate election in Montana, 2002

2004 elections
United States presidential election in Montana, 2004
Montana gubernatorial election, 2004

2006 elections
United States Senate election in Montana, 2006
United States House of Representatives election in Montana, 2006

2008 elections
United States presidential election in Montana, 2008
United States Senate election in Montana, 2008
United States House of Representatives election in Montana, 2008
Montana Democratic primary, 2008
Montana Republican caucuses, 2008
Montana gubernatorial election, 2008

2010s

2010 elections
Montana elections, 2010
United States House of Representatives election in Montana, 2010

2012 elections

United States presidential election in Montana, 2012
United States Senate election in Montana, 2012
United States House of Representatives election in Montana, 2012
Montana Republican caucuses, 2012
Montana gubernatorial election, 2012

2014 elections
United States Senate election in Montana, 2014
2014 Montana judicial elections

2016 elections
2016 United States presidential election in Montana
2016 United States House of Representatives election in Montana
2016 Montana gubernatorial election

2018 elections 

 2018 United States House of Representatives election in Montana
 2018 United States Senate election in Montana

2020s

2020 elections 

 2020 United States House of Representatives election in Montana
 2020 United States Senate election in Montana
 2020 Montana gubernatorial election

2022 elections 

 2022 United States House of Representatives elections in Montana

See also
Political party strength in Montana
United States presidential elections in Montana
Women's suffrage in Montana

References

Works cited

External links
Counties History

 
 
  (State affiliate of the U.S. League of Women Voters)
 

 
Government of Montana
Political events in Montana